Ulkopolitiikka (Finnish: The Finnish Journal of Foreign Affairs) is a Finnish-language magazine of international relations studies published by The Finnish Institute of International Affairs. The quarterly has been in circulation since 1961. It provides a significant forum on global politics and economics in Finland and is one of the leading magazines in the country.

History
Ulkopolitiikka was launched in 1961. The magazine's headquarters is in Helsinki, and it is published by the Finnish Institute of International Affairs, a private institute attached to the Foundation for Foreign Policy Research. The magazine provides news on politics, economics and international affairs. The editor-in-chief was Matti Kalliokoski from 1994 to 1995. One of the contributors was Swedish diplomat Anders Thunborg.

Ulkopolitiikka was awarded in 2012 the quality award of the Association for Cultural, Scientific and Advocacy Magazines.

See also
List of magazines in Finland

References

External links
 

1961 establishments in Finland
Finnish-language magazines
Magazines established in 1961
Magazines published in Helsinki
Political magazines published in Finland
Quarterly magazines published in Finland